KIC 11026764, nicknamed "Gemma" by Li et al., is a G-type main sequence star whose characteristics have been extensively measured by the Kepler spacecraft because of its similarity to the Sun. Its diameter is 2.18 times the Sun and is aged at 5.94 billion years, slightly older than the Sun.

The star exhibits a weak quasi-periodic pulsations with frequency around 0.0009 Hz.

References

Further reading

Cygnus (constellation)
G-type main-sequence stars
BD+48 2882
J19212465+4830532
Kepler Input Catalog